Yarijan-e Sofla (also Romanized as Yārījān-e Soflá; also known as Yārījān-e Pā’īn) is a village in Zarrineh Rud Rural District, in the Central District of Miandoab County, West Azerbaijan Province, Iran. At the 2006 census, its population was 411, in 90 families.

References 

Populated places in Miandoab County